Neochera dominia is a species of moth in the family Erebidae. It is found from the Indo-Australian tropics from India to Queensland and the Solomons.

The wingspan is about 60 mm.

The larvae feed on Marsdenia species.

Subspecies
Neochera dominia affinis (Indonesia, Papua New Guinea)
Neochera dominia basilissa (Australia, Indonesia)
Neochera dominia butleri (China, India, Indonesia, Malaysia, Myanmar, Nepal, the Philippines, Sikkim, Thailand, northern Vietnam)
Neochera dominia contraria (Vanuatu)
Neochera dominia dominia (India, Indonesia)
Neochera dominia eugenia (Indonesia, Papua New Guinea and Philippines)
Neochera dominia fumosa (Indonesia)
Neochera dominia fuscipennis (Papua New Guinea)
Neochera dominia heliconides (Sumbawa, Philippines: Palawan, Luzon, Negros)
Neochera dominia herpa (Indonesia)
Neochera dominia javana (Indonesia)
Neochera dominia papuana (Indonesia and Papua New Guinea)
Neochera dominia proxima (Indonesia: Java and Timor, Papua New Guinea)
Neochera dominia stibostethia (Buru)

External links
 The Moths of Borneo
 dominia dominia info

Aganainae
Moths of Asia
Moths described in 1780